Alberto Lupo (byname of Alberto Zoboli; 19 December 1924 – 13 August 1984) was an Italian film and television actor best known for his roles in swash-buckling and actions films of the 1960s.

Lupo starred in films such as A 008, operazione Sterminio in 1965 as Agent 006.

Partial filmography

 Ulysses (1954) - One of Penelope's Suitors (uncredited)
 Uomini ombra (1954) - Narrator (uncredited)
 L'ultima violenza (1957) - Mauri
 The Adventures of Nicholas Nickleby (1958, TV series) - Walter Bray
 Herod the Great (1958) - Aronne / Aaron
 Wolves of the Deep (1959) - Radiotelegrafista
 The Giant of Marathon (1959) - Miltiades
 Atom Age Vampire (1960) - Prof. Alberto Levin
 Minotaur, the Wild Beast of Crete (1960) - Chirone
 The Bacchantes (1961) - Pentheus
 Blood Feud (1961)
 Revenge of the Conquered (1961)
 Ursus in the Valley of the Lions (1961) - Ayak
 Rocco e le sorelle (1961)
 La monaca di Monza (1962) - Giudice
 Lasciapassare per il morto (1962) - Maurizio
 Zorro alla corte di Spagna (1962) - Miguel
 Swordsman of Siena (1962)  - Andrea Paresi
 Gli italiani e le donne (1962) - Alberto (segment "Chi la fa l'aspetti")
 Un alibi per morire (1962)
 Destination Rome (1963) - Paolino
 The Shortest Day (1963) - Ufficiale (uncredited)
  (1963) - Baron Rudolf Keller
 Torpedo Bay (1963) - Magri
 The Bread Peddler (1963) - Étienne Castel
 Coriolanus: Hero without a Country (1964) - Sicinio
 La Cittadella (1964) - Dr. Andrew Manson
 The Lion of Thebes (1964) - Menelao
 Genoveffa di Brabante (1964) - Count Sigfrido di Treviri
 Il figlio di Cleopatra (1964) - Octavian
 008: Operation Exterminate (1965) - Frank Smith, Agent 606
 The Agony and the Ecstasy (1965) - Duke of Urbino
 Night of Violence (1965) - Commisario Ferretti
 Spiaggia libera (1965) - L'ingegnere
 Django Shoots First (1966) - Doc
 Io ti amo (1968) - Prince Tancredi di Castelvolturno
 Action (1980) - Joe

External links  

 
Biography at Mymovies.it

Italian male film actors
1924 births
1984 deaths
Actors from Genoa
Italian male television actors
Italian male stage actors
Italian television presenters
20th-century Italian male actors